Marco Crugnola (born 24 May 1983) is an Italian professional tennis player.

Challenger finals

Singles: 2 (0-2)

Doubles: 12 (6-6)

References

External links
 
 

Italian male tennis players
Living people
1983 births
21st-century Italian people